Bahaa Mamdouh Ellithi (born 19 April 1999) is a Qatari born-Egyptian professional footballer who plays as a defender for Qatar Stars League side Al Sadd.

Career statistics

Club

Notes

Club
Al-Sadd
Qatar Cup: 2021

References

External links

1999 births
Living people
Qatari footballers
Al Sadd SC players
Qatar SC players
Qatar Stars League players
Naturalised citizens of Qatar
Qatari people of Egyptian descent
Association football defenders
Qatar under-20 international footballers
Qatar youth international footballers